Elections to local bodies in Andhra Pradesh are being held in four phases in rural areas (panchayats) in February 2021 viz. 9 February 2021, 13 February 2021, 17 February 2021 and 21 February 2021 covering 13 districts. In the first phase, 29,732 polling stations were set up.

Urban local body elections to 12 municipal corporations and 75 municipal and town councils will be held on 10 March, with a possible second round on 13 March.

Elections in the state to district and township panchayats will be scheduled at a later date.

Grama Panchayati elections

Election schedule 
State Election Commission, headed by N. Ramesh Kumar, appointed K. Kanna Babu, IAS as Secretary of SEC and N. Sanjay, IPS to provide leadership for local elections.

Phase 1

Phase 2

Phase 3

Phase 4

Elections held

Phase 1

Phase 2 
In the second phase, 539 sarpanch seats have been unanimously won, So, there is no election in those grama panchayatis. The elections were held in 18 revenue divisions and 167 mandals.

Urban local body/ Municipal elections 
The elections were previously scheduled on March 23 were post-poned due to COVID-19 pandemic in India. The election process will be continued from the previous nominations filed. The elections will be held in 12 municipal corporations and 75 municipalities or nagara panchaytis. Elections will not be conducted in Rajamahendravaram Municipal Corporation, Nellore Municipal Corporation, Srikakulam Municipal Corporation and 29 municipalities/nagara panchaytis.

Election schedule

Election results

Municipal corporations

Municipalities

Nagar Panchayats

See also 

 2021 Greater Visakhapatnam Municipal Corporation election
 2021 Vijayawada Municipal Corporation election
 2021 Guntur Municipal Corporation election

References

External links 

Four phase Grama Panchayati election schedule
Urban Local Bodies election notification and schedule

2020s in Andhra Pradesh
2021 elections in India
Local government in Andhra Pradesh
Local elections in Andhra Pradesh